Carols for Choirs is a collection of choral scores, predominantly of Christmas carols and hymns, first published in 1961 by Oxford University Press. It was edited by Sir David Willcocks and Reginald Jacques, and is a widely used source of carols in the British Anglican tradition and among British choral societies. A second volume was published in 1970, edited by David Willcocks and John Rutter, and the collection is now available in five volumes. A compendium edition was published later. In addition to music for Christmas, the collection also offers works that are suitable for other Christian festivals such as Advent and Epiphany.

The books contain the most commonly performed carols and their harmony arrangements, with descants from the editors (mainly Willcocks) which have become the de facto standard descants for these tunes in the Anglican communion in the UK. Most of the arrangements were originally written for use by the Choir of King's College, Cambridge or the Bach Choir in London.

History

Carols For Choirs was originally launched by the organist and music editor at Oxford University Press Christopher Morris. Whilst working at St George's, Hanover Square, he realised that church choirs lacked a definitive book of Christmas carols, and felt that a single book would be more convenient than using separate pieces of sheet music and hymn books. Under his direction, the first book of Carols for Choirs was commissioned. The book was originally to be called Carols for Concerts. To edit the collection, Morris enlisted David Willcocks, Director of Music at King's College, Cambridge, and Reginald Jacques, conductor of the Bach Choir. The book was published in 1961, containing new arrangements of traditional carols, but it also popularised pieces by modern composers such as William Walton, Benjamin Britten, Richard Rodney Bennett, William Mathias and John Rutter. Carols for Choirs was an instant success and became OUP Music Department's best-selling title, with over a million copies being sold. OUP were keen to commission a second volume, but after the death of Jacques in 1969, a new editor had to be found to support Willcocks, and an undergraduate at Cambridge University, John Rutter, was recruited. Carols for Choirs 2 was published in 1970.

The books in the Carols For Choirs collection came to be regarded as standard choral texts throughout the English-speaking world and were highly influential; according to the composer John Rutter, they "changed the whole sound of Christmas for everybody who sings".

On 29 December 2021, it was announced that a new volume, Carols for Choirs 6, would be published in the summer of 2023. A poll was released to suggest the colour of the new book, the most popular colour being purple.

Volumes
Choir singers usually refer to the books by the colours of their covers, with the "green" and "orange" books (volumes 1 and 2) being the most widely used.  The "blue" book (volume 3) contains a number of longer anthems.  A compendium volumethe white bookconsisting of 74 of the most popular items from Carols for Choirs 1, 2 and 3, plus 26 pieces new to the series. was published in 1987. It contains both accompanied and unaccompanied items, as well as the Order of Service for a Festival of Nine Lessons and Carols.

The "red" book (Volume 4) features fifty carols arranged for sopranos and altos. 
Oxford University Press extended the series with volumes appropriate for other church seasons, such as Lent/Easter.  In July 2011, Oxford University Press published the fifth incarnation of the original series, Carols for Choirs 5, edited by composer Bob Chilcott, to celebrate the 50th anniversary of the publication of the first volume; it is presented in gold covers.

Other seasons

Contents

See also
 Christmas music
 List of Christmas carols
 Nine Lessons and Carols (Carols from King's College, Cambridge)
 Oxford Book of Carols

References

External links
 OUP: Carols for Choirs
 Obituary of Christopher Morris, the organist and publisher who launched the book Carols For Choirs.
 
 
 
 

Christmas carol collections
Oxford University Press books
Anglican church music
1961 in Christianity
1961 books